Early American Imprints is a digital and microopaque card (not the more common microfiche) collection produced by Readex.  It is based on Charles Evan's (1850 - 1935) American Bibliography. Ralph Shaw (1907–72) and Richard Shoemaker's (1907–70) collaborative efforts continued American Bibliography.  American Bibliography contains the full text of all known existing books, pamphlets, and broadsides printed in the United States (or British American colonies prior to Independence) from 1639 through 1819, some 72,000 titles.   It is now also available in electronic form as part of the Readex Archive of Americana.

History

The microprint edition was undertaken by the American Antiquarian Society in 1955 and edited by Dr. Clifford K. Shipton, then director of the Society. The extensive collection of early American imprints in the Society's library provided a substantial number of the imprints that were filmed. Many other major libraries in the United States and Europe also made texts available and provided editorial corrections to the original bibliographic work of Charles Evans.  The series is available in two parts:

Early American Imprints: Series I Evans, 1639–1800, 
Early American Imprints: Series II Shaw-Shoemaker, 1801–1819

Library Holdings

United States
Many major research libraries, and some public libraries hold the series, including:
Harvard University
Library of Congress See: American Imprint Collection
Columbia University
Cornell
New York Public Library
Arizona State University
Wayne State University
The only library in the USA able to print from microopaque card to paper is at University of Missouri.

United Kingdom
The British Library
Cambridge University Library
National Library of Scotland
Vere Harmsworth Library, University of Oxford

See also
 Books in the United States

References

External links
 Readex 

Publications
Ephemera
Historiography of the United States